Dr. Taleh Ziyadov is Director-General of Baku International Sea Trade Port in Azerbaijan. He holds a Ph.D. degree from the Cambridge University (UK) and master's degree from the School of Foreign Service at Georgetown University (Washington, DC). He specializes in transport, logistics and energy issues in the Caspian region. Since 2008, he has advised a number of private and public companies as well as international organizations on the matter of transport and logistics in Azerbaijan and the Greater Central Asian region. He is the author of the book Azerbaijan as a Regional Hub in Central Eurasia (Baku: ADA, 2012), which provides a strategic analysis of the Euro-Asian trade and transportation networks through Central Eurasia, outlining the vision for developing Azerbaijan into a "regional hub" by 2030. Previously, he served as Deputy Executive Director of the US-Azerbaijan Chamber of Commerce (USACC) in Washington, DC and as Assistant Dean and Senior Research Fellow at ADA University in Baku.

Sources 
 

Living people
Alumni of the University of Cambridge
Walsh School of Foreign Service alumni
Year of birth missing (living people)